Martina Navratilova and Leander Paes defeated Eleni Daniilidou and Todd Woodbridge in the final, 6–4, 7–5 to win the mixed doubles tennis title at the 2003 Australian Open. It was Navratilova's first Australian Open mixed doubles title and eighth mixed doubles title overall, and the first Australian Open and second mixed doubles title for Paes. With the win, Navratilova became the fourth woman in history to complete the career Grand Slam in mixed doubles, and became only the third player in history to complete the "Boxed Set" (career Grand Slams in singles, same-sex doubles, and mixed doubles).

Daniela Hantuchová and Kevin Ullyett were the defending champions, but lost in the semifinals to Navratilova and Paes.

Seeds

Draw

Finals

Top half

Bottom half

External links
 Official Results Archive (Australian Open)
 Official Results Archive (WTA)
 2003 Australian Open – Doubles draws and results at the International Tennis Federation

Mixed Doubles
Australian Open (tennis) by year – Mixed doubles